Kartik Sena Sinha is a Bharatiya Janata Party politician from Assam. He has been elected in Assam Legislative Assembly election in 2006 from Patharkandi constituency.

References 

Living people
Bharatiya Janata Party politicians from Assam
21st-century Indian politicians
Members of the Assam Legislative Assembly
People from Karimganj district
Year of birth missing (living people)
Bishnupriya Manipuri people